Lewis Blake (born June 1946) is a British poet and artist. He is a member of the Cambridge School of poetry, and, to a certain extent, the British Poetry Revival.

Life

Blake was born in Reydon, near Southwold in Suffolk in June 1946. He was educated at City College Norwich before going to read Philosophy and English Literature at the University of Bristol.

For some time he worked as a newspaper journalist as a writer of obituaries and a reviewer of literary texts. As well as working as a mainstream journalist he has also written reviews for the academic journals ELH and PMLA.

Works

Blake's works are known for their surreal humour, unusual use of subordinate clauses and his borrowing of esoteric, technical words. His poems include such combinations as computer acronyms and file types juxtaposed with hip-hop style speech and literary criticism and valley girl speak.

Influences

Blake's influences are wide ranging, and his poems contain eclectic references to different cultures. In particular he draws on surrealism, dadaism, the contemporary avant-garde and members of the beat generation.

References

His poetry is included in:

Persing, Louisa, Ed. (1976). To Banbury Cross and Back: A Collection of Modern Poetry, Palomar Publishing Co. 

1946 births
Living people
People from Southwold
English male journalists
Alumni of the University of Bristol
English male poets